In Greek mythology, Cercaphus (Ancient Greek: Κέρκαφος) may refer to the following figures:

 Cercaphus, one of the Heliadae.
 Cercaphus, son of Aeolus and father of Ormenus, the eponymous founder of Ormenium in Thessaly.
 Cercaphus, father of Maeander by Anaxibia.
Cercaphus, descendant of Helios (Sun) and brother of Alpheus. While contending about the kingdom, Cercaphus was slain by his brother who was then pursued by the Furies and later on, flung himself to the river Nyctimus in Arcadia which bore his name thereafter.

Notes

References 
Diodorus Siculus, The Library of History translated by Charles Henry Oldfather. Twelve volumes. Loeb Classical Library. Cambridge, Massachusetts: Harvard University Press; London: William Heinemann, Ltd. 1989. Vol. 3. Books 4.59–8. Online version at Bill Thayer's Web Site
Diodorus Siculus, Bibliotheca Historica. Vol 1-2. Immanel Bekker. Ludwig Dindorf. Friedrich Vogel. in aedibus B. G. Teubneri. Leipzig. 1888–1890. Greek text available at the Perseus Digital Library.
Lucius Mestrius Plutarchus, Morals translated from the Greek by several hands. Corrected and revised by. William W. Goodwin, PH. D. Boston. Little, Brown, and Company. Cambridge. Press Of John Wilson and son. 1874. 5. Online version at the Perseus Digital Library.
Strabo, The Geography of Strabo. Edition by H.L. Jones. Cambridge, Mass.: Harvard University Press; London: William Heinemann, Ltd. 1924. Online version at the Perseus Digital Library.
Strabo, Geographica edited by A. Meineke. Leipzig: Teubner. 1877. Greek text available at the Perseus Digital Library.

Characters in Greek mythology